The Azkena Rock Festival (a.k.a. ARF) is one of the most relevant Spanish rock festivals. It is celebrated in Vitoria-Gasteiz (Álava) organized by Last Tour International. ARF is notorious due to its diverse cartel of groups and for the submerse 'chill' environment of the festival. It is aimed to underground public, escaping commercial mainstream agenda.

In 2006, the festival sold over 44,000 tickets, the most in its history,  due to the presence of Pearl Jam. Some other bands included Iggy & The Stooges, Wilco, Alice Cooper, Social Distortion, Tool, Queens of the Stone Age, Ray Davies, Bad Religion, Sex Pistols, Deep Purple, The Black Crowes, Hanoi Rocks, Fun Lovin Criminals, Kiss, Slash, Imelda May or Bad Brains. In 2011 the festival celebrated the 10th anniversary with the "rocker" topic: Las Vegas.

Editions

2002 edition 
The inaugural festival was celebrated in the Azkena Gasteiz and was organized by Muskerra (an organization of the Basque Country). The duration was of three days:12–14  September 2002.

2003 edition 
The second edition of the festival was the big jump it needed to become as good as it was planned to be. Three new things made the festival a great rock place where people could enjoy very different things always with this rock music. The first one was that took plaze in Mendizorroza, Vitoria-Gasteiz.
The best point of that year was that there were two different stages and all the concerts took place one after other with little gap between performances. The Stooges were chosen as the headline act that year. In total 12,000 fans attended to the little city of Vitoria so they could enjoy the Azkena Rock Festival. This made money and they used that for the next editions.

2004 edition 
This was the most accidented edition in the history of the festival. Some names were known in May 2004 that were: Urge Overkill, Redd Kross, The Screamin' Cheetah Wheelies, Turbonegro, The Soundtrack Of Our Lives, Stacey Earle & Mark Stuart, Josh Rouse Band, Hoodoo Gurus.
In the most important or the heads was the group from NY, DKT/MC which were the heads of the first edition in Spain. In late June it was confirmed the rest groups which were: Velvet Revolver, Bide Ertzean, Five Horse Johnson, Jonny Kaplan & The Lazy Stars, Mark Lanegan Band, Matthew Sweet, The Mooney Suzuki which finally did not attend.

On 12 July it was said on the radio that the New York Dolls were coming and this made the festival even more attractive. This was confirmed in the news and newspapers. The festival took place over four days rather than the previous two. The first day was 9 September, with performances by the New York Dolls, Five Horse Johnson and Urge Overkill.

2005 edition

2006 edition

2007 edition 

This year was considered to be a transition year because of the many rumors of the abolishment of the festival. But finally 40,000 people attended over the three days duration. It was not until summer that it was decided that the headline act was Tool. It was not as successful as it was supposed it was going to be.

2008 edition 
This year was again rumored that the Azkena was lost because the bad organization of the festival and also because of the constant changes they made with the choices. But this year the Ayuntamiento of Vitoria-Gastiz made an effort and paid €500,000 so it would last three days. The first groups were known before the local government had given approval to do the Azkena for these days. The headliner was Dinosaur Jr. and that was the reason why many people attended this year.

2009 edition 
In 2009 the Azkena Rock again gaining strength with one of his best posters in years thanks to the introduction of big-name legends like The Black Crowes or Alice Cooper. The performance of the band of brothers Robinson was one of the most anticipated and did not disappoint, giving a real lesson in excellence. Electric Eel Shock were perhaps the only band that could have followed such a show and close the main stage in outstanding fashion. Alice Cooper's concert was full of old tricks and classic, leaving a big smile on her fans old and new.

2010 edition

2011 edition

2012 edition

2013 edition

2014 edition

2015 edition

2016 edition

2017 edition

References

External links 

Página oficial del festival
Foro Azkena Rock Festival
Página de noticias de Last Tour International
Página web de Muskerra

Rock festivals in Spain